Atonic may refer to:

In music:
 Atonality, lack of a key or tonal center

In medicine:
 Atony, a muscle losing its strength

In linguistics:
 Atonic or unaccented, a syllable without stress or pitch accent